Changing Lanes is a 2002 American drama thriller film directed by Roger Michell and starring Ben Affleck and Samuel L. Jackson. The film follows a successful, young Wall Street lawyer (Affleck) who accidentally crashes his car into a vehicle driven by a middle-aged, recovering alcoholic insurance salesman (Jackson). After the lawyer leaves the scene of the accident, the two men try to get back at each other, engaging in a variety of immoral and illegal actions that end up having a major impact on each man's life.

The film was released on April 12, 2002 in North America by Paramount Pictures. The film was favorably reviewed by critics, and it was a box office success, earning almost $95 million against a $45 million budget. Writers Chap Taylor and Michael Tolkin were nominated for the WAFCA Award for Best Original Screenplay for their work.

Plot
In New York City, two men are rushing to court. One, a middle-aged, black insurance salesman named Doyle Gipson, a recovering alcoholic attending Alcoholics Anonymous meetings to stay sober, is en route to a hearing to argue for joint custody of his sons with his estranged wife. The other, a successful, young, white Wall Street attorney named Gavin Banek, is rushing to file a power of appointment document to prove a dead man signed his foundation over to Banek's law firm. Banek is distracted while driving on the FDR Drive and his 2000 Mercedes-Benz CLK 430 collides with Gipson's 1988 Toyota Corolla. Banek tries to brush Gipson off with a blank check, rather than exchanging insurance information, thereby disobeying the law. Gipson refuses to accept the check and voices his desire to "do this right", but Banek, whose car is still drivable, insists upon leaving immediately. He leaves Gipson stranded, telling him, "better luck next time". After arriving to the court late, Gipson learns that the judge ruled against him in his absence, giving sole custody of the boys to Gipson's wife and allowing her to proceed with a plan to move to Oregon, never knowing that Gipson was about to buy a house locally and give it to his wife and children as part of his effort to make joint custody workable for everyone.

When Banek gets to court, he realizes that he dropped the crucial power of appointment file at the scene of the accident, and the judge gives him until the end of the day to retrieve it. Gipson, who scooped up the file, is torn, and initially refuses to return the file. Banek, who is desperate to get his papers back, goes to a "fixer", a shady computer hacker, and gets him to switch off Gipson's credit, destroying Gipson's chance for a home loan to keep his family together. Gipson is distraught when he finds out his credit has been ruined and he comes close to drinking again. Determined to get back at Banek, Gipson removes several lug nuts from one of Banek's wheels, and Banek suffers some minor injuries after his car crashes on the highway. An infuriated Banek goes to the elementary school of Gipson's children and tells school officials that Gipson plans to kidnap the boys, so Gipson is arrested and jailed.  His enraged wife declares her intention to move forward with taking their sons to Oregon and says that Gipson will never see them again.

Both men, shaken by the consequences of their actions, start to reconsider their desire for vengeance and try to find a way out. Although it appears unlikely that either man will achieve what he had hoped, both resolve to let go and do what is right, and the two men apologize to each other. Gipson returns the file containing the power of appointment, which Banek has since learned was obtained illegally, and he uses it to blackmail his boss to conduct business honestly and get approval to represent Gipson pro bono to resolve his legal troubles. Banek also visits Gipson's wife, asking her to "give me five minutes." The next day, Gipson is walking and notices his wife and sons standing across the street, smiling at him.

Cast

 Ben Affleck as Gavin Banek
 Samuel L. Jackson as Doyle Gipson
 Kim Staunton as Valerie Gipson
 Toni Collette as Michelle
 Sydney Pollack as Stephen Delano
 Tina Sloan as Mrs. Delano
 Richard Jenkins as Walter Arnell
 Akil Walker as Stephen Gibson
 Cole Hawkins as Danny Gipson
 Ileen Getz as Ellen
 Jennifer Dundas Lowe as Mina Dunne
 Matt Malloy as Ron Cabot
 Amanda Peet as Cynthia Banek
 Bruce Altman as Joe Kaufman
 Joe Grifasi as Judge Cosell
 Angela Goethals as Sarah Windsor
 Kevin Sussman as Tyler Cohen
 William Hurt as Sponsor
 John Benjamin Hickey as Carlyle
 Dylan Baker as Finch
 Jordan Gelber as Priest
 Olga Merediz as Mrs. Miller
 Jayne Houdyshell as Miss Tetley

Reception

Box office
The film was a box office success, with a budget of $45,000,000, it grossed $66,818,548 in the United States and $28,117,216 internationally, for a total gross of $94,935,764.

Critical response
Review aggregation website Rotten Tomatoes gives the film an approval rating of 77% based on 151 reviews, with an average rating of 7/10. The site's critics consensus states: "Though some may find its conclusion unsatisfying, Changing Lanes is a tense, well-crafted exploration of meaty ethical dilemmas." Metacritic assigned the film a weighted average score of 69 out of 100, based on 36 critics, indicating "generally favorable reviews". Audiences polled by CinemaScore gave the film an average grade of "B−" on an A+ to F scale.

Roger Ebert of Chicago Sun-Times praised the film, calling it one of the year's best.

References

External links

 
 
 
 
 

2000s thriller drama films
2002 films
2002 psychological thriller films
American thriller drama films
2000s English-language films
Films scored by David Arnold
Films about alcoholism
Films about lawyers
Films directed by Roger Michell
Films produced by Scott Rudin
Films set in New York City
Films shot in New York City
Paramount Pictures films
Films with screenplays by Michael Tolkin
2002 drama films
Films about road accidents and incidents
2000s American films